The Torneo Internacional de Fútbol Sub-20 de L'Alcúdia (L'Alcúdia International Under-20 Football Tournament), better known as COTIF, is an annual international invitational football competition for youth teams, open to both clubs and national and autonomous teams, held in L'Alcúdia, Valencia since 1984. Since 2012 it also holds a senior women's football tournament. From the 2016 edition, the men's tournament will feature international under-20 teams only.

Champions

Men's under-20 football

Women's football

1 Levante UD won 3–2 on penalties.
2 Real Betis  won 5–4 on penalties.

Broadcasting rights 

 Latin America: TNT 
 : Esporte Interativo 
 : TNT Sports
 : TNT Sports
 : AUF TV

See also

References

Football in the Valencian Community
Youth football in Spain
Recurring sporting events established in 1984
International club association football competitions hosted by Spain